MV ‘Otuanga’ofa ("friendly islands") is an inter-island ferry which has operated in Tonga since 2010. It replaced .

The ship was built in Japan and was paid for by the Japanese government at a cost of US$16 million. It arrived in Tonga in October 2010, and after a period of testing, entered service with the Friendly Island Shipping Agency in December 2010. It normally operates between Nukuʻalofa, Pangai, and Neiafu.

In January 2012 it collided with a stationary vessel twice at Nukuʻalofa while trying to dock. In May 2014 it ran aground at Niuatoputapu. In July 2014 it was sent to Fiji for maintenance after cracks were found inside a ballast tank. In June 2015 the captain was fired after the ship was found to be leaking.

In September 2022 it was sent to Auckland, New Zealand for repairs. On its arrival, it was told to stay outside new Zealand waters for three weeks due to biosecurity risks. The repairs took longer than expected, and the ferry's absence caused significant disruption to the education of students in the Niua Islands, who were unable to travel to Tongatapu for the beginning of the school year. The ferry is now expected to return to Tonga in March 2023.

References

Ships of Tonga
2010 ships
Ships built in Japan
Ferries